The 1957 DFB-Pokal Final decided the winner of the 1956–57 DFB-Pokal, the 14th season of Germany's knockout football cup competition. It was played on 29 December 1957 at the Rosenaustadion in Augsburg. Bayern Munich won the match 1–0 against Fortuna Düsseldorf, to claim their 1st cup title.

Route to the final
The DFB-Pokal began with 5 teams in a single-elimination knockout cup competition. There were a total of two rounds leading up to the final. In the qualification round, all but two teams were given a bye. Teams were drawn against each other, and the winner after 90 minutes would advance. If still tied, 30 minutes of extra time was played. If the score was still level, a replay would take place at the original away team's stadium. If still level after 90 minutes, 30 minutes of extra time was played. If the score was still level, a drawing of lots would decide who would advance to the next round.

Note: In all results below, the score of the finalist is given first (H: home; A: away).

Match

Details

References

External links
 Match report at kicker.de 
 Match report at WorldFootball.net
 Match report at Fussballdaten.de 

Fortuna Düsseldorf matches
FC Bayern Munich matches
1956–57 in German football cups
1957
Sport in Augsburg
20th century in Augsburg
December 1957 sports events in Europe